Usmangali (Uśmanğäle) is a rural locality (a selo) in Inzersky Selsoviet, Beloretsky District, Bashkortostan, Russia. The population was 404, as of 2010. There are 9 streets.

Geography 
Usmangali is located 95 km northwest of Beloretsk (the district's administrative centre) by road. Inzer is the nearest rural locality.

References 

Rural localities in Beloretsky District